Film Base Berlin GmbH is a film production company located in Berlin, Germany. In 2011 Film Base service produced The Berlin File for RHYOO Seung Wan, that was partly shot in Berlin and was service producer on the international TV-Series The Transporter for Atlantique Films in Paris starring Chris Vance. Film Base Berlin  also co-produced the documentary Recognition (Hakara), directed by Sharon Ryba-Kahn which was shot in Israel. The company shares producer credits on the film The Interrogation. The Interrogation is an Israeli-Germany co-production directed by Erez Pery. The film is co-produced by the Israel-based Daroma Productions. In 2015 the feature film The Cakemaker, a co-production with the Tel Aviv-based Laila Films, is being shot in Berlin and Jerusalem.

Credits

References 

http://m.screendaily.com/5049254.article

http://www.openpr.com/news/221089/Ryoo-Seung-wan-filming-this-week-in-Berlin.html?SID=a4e494f0d987d9891f6c56738a29b08e

External links 
 

Film production companies of Germany
Mass media in Berlin